Wilhelm Halpern (5 February 1895 – 4 March 1973) was an Austrian footballer. He played in three matches for the Austria national football team from 1917 to 1918.

References

External links
 

1895 births
1973 deaths
Austrian footballers
Austria international footballers
Place of birth missing
Association footballers not categorized by position